Joseph Taylor Ward (born December 14, 1993) is an American professional baseball third baseman and outfielder for the Los Angeles Angels of Major League Baseball (MLB). 

Ward was raised in Central Florida before moving to Indio, California, where he attended Shadow Hills High School and emerged as a notable baseball prospect as a catcher. He played three seasons of college baseball for the Fresno State Bulldogs, earning multiple conference accolades. The Angels drafted Ward in the first round of the 2015 MLB draft, 26th overall. After spending four seasons in the Angels farm system and being converted to a third baseman, he made his MLB debut in 2018.

In his first four major league seasons, Ward did not find consistent playing time and was sent back down to the minor leagues on multiple occasions. In 2019, the Angels converted him to primarily play the outfield, forcing him to compete with fellow top prospects Jo Adell and Brandon Marsh for a spot while veterans Mike Trout, Justin Upton, and Kole Calhoun received most of the playing time. In 2022, Ward became the Angels' primary right fielder and was credited with a breakout season after he hit 23 home runs and led qualified Angels batters with a .281 batting average and a .360 on-base percentage (OBP).

Early life
Joseph Taylor Ward was born on December 12, 1993, in Dayton, Ohio, to parents Joe and Samantha Ward. During his childhood, Ward's family moved to Oviedo, Florida, a suburb of Orlando. He enrolled at Hagerty High School for his freshman year of high school in 2008.

In 2009, Ward's family moved to the Coachella Valley in Southern California, where he enrolled at the newly-opened Shadow Hills High School in Indio for his sophomore year. He played catcher for the Shadow Hills baseball team and was a two-time De Anza League First Team selection. In his junior season, he was named the De Anza League MVP and Offensive Player of the Year while also earning CIF Southern Section First Team honors. In his senior season, he caught for eventual MLB pitcher Tyson Miller, forming the team's top battery. Ward committed to play college baseball for California State University, Fresno, becoming the first student in Shadow Hills history to receive an athletic scholarship from an NCAA Division I school. He was selected by the Tampa Bay Rays in the 31st round of the 2012 Major League Baseball draft but did not sign with the team, moving forward with his plans to attend college.

College career
Ward enrolled at California State University, Fresno to play college baseball for the Fresno State Bulldogs. In 2013, his freshman season, Ward's Bulldogs teammates included eventual major leaguers Aaron Judge, Jordan Luplow, and Austin Wynns. In his first college season, Ward posted a .196 batting average with three home runs and 15 runs batted in (RBIs) in 46 games. After the season, he made his collegiate summer baseball debut with the Anchorage Bucs of the Alaska Baseball League, batting .206 with three RBIs in 19 games.

In 2014, during his sophomore season, Ward earned two Mountain West Conference Player of the Week selections, first on February 24 and later on March 3. He finished the season batting .320 with six home runs and 41 RBIs, ranking second on the team in each category behind the elder Luplow. He was named to the All-Mountain West second team as a catcher. Following the season, he was given a tryout for the United States collegiate national baseball team on May 28 and he made the 24-man roster on June 30. Ward also played collegiate summer baseball with the Orleans Firebirds of the Cape Cod Baseball League, joining Jake Cronenworth, Bobby Dalbec, and David Fletcher on the team. In seven games for Orleans, Ward went 4-for-20 (.222) with a home run and a pair of RBIs.

In 2015, his junior season, Ward batted .304 with seven home runs and 42 RBIs, leading the team in the latter two categories. He was named to the All-Mountain West first team as a catcher. Ward was a finalist for the Johnny Bench Award, given annually to the best catcher in college baseball.

Professional career

Draft and minor leagues
Following his junior season with Fresno State, Ward was ranked as the 70th-best draft prospect by Baseball America and 99th by MLB.com. Ward was drafted by the Los Angeles Angels in the first round of the 2015 MLB draft, the 26th overall pick. He became the 17th player in Fresno State history to be selected in the first round of the MLB draft, succeeding Aaron Judge's 2013 first-round selection. Ward was one of three Fresno State players selected in the 2015 draft. He signed with the Angels on June 12 for a $1,670,000 bonus, below the recommended $2,036,000 for the 26th draft slot.

Ward made his professional debut with the Rookie Advanced-level Orem Owlz of the Pioneer League, going 0-for-4 against the Ogden Raptors in his first game on August 18, 2015. He recorded his first professional hit on August 23, a single off Grand Junction Rockies pitcher Chad Zurat. Ward was selected as a Pioneer League All-Star, scoring a run during the exhibition on August 4. In 32 games with Orem, Ward batted .349 with two home runs, 19 RBIs, a .489 on-base percentage (OBP), and .459 slugging percentage (SLG). On August 6, he was promoted to the Single-A Burlington Bees of the Midwest League. Between the two teams, he batted .348 with three home runs and 31 RBIs in 56 games.

In 2016, Ward was a non-roster invitee to Angels spring training for the first time. Prior to the start of the season, he was promoted to the Class A-Advanced Inland Empire 66ers of the California League. He spent the entire year with Inland Empire, batting .249 with ten home runs and 56 RBIs in 123 games. Following the season, Ward played for the Scottsdale Scorpions of the Arizona Fall League (AFL). He was selected as an AFL All-Star and finished batting .283 with nine RBIs in 16 games. MiLB.com named Ward an Angels Organization All-Star for 2016.

In 2017, Ward returned to Inland Empire to begin the season. On April 5, he was placed on the 7-day disabled list but did not return until May 3. In 54 games with the 66ers, Ward batted .242 with six home runs and 30 RBIs. On July 20, he was promoted to the Double-A Mobile BayBears of the Southern League, remaining with the team for the rest of the season. In 87 games between both teams, Ward batted .258 with nine home runs and 49 RBIs. MiLB.com named him an Angels Organization All-Star for the second straight season.

Prior to the 2018 season, the Angels converted Ward from catcher to a third baseman. He returned to Mobile to start the year, where he made his professional debut at third base on April 5. Ward was named a Southern League mid-season All-Star. In 42 games with Mobile, Ward batted .345 with six home runs and 25 RBIs. On June 2, Ward was promoted to the Triple-A Salt Lake Bees of the Pacific Coast League. In 60 games with Salt Lake, he batted .352 with eight home runs and 35 RBIs. Following the season, Ward was named an Angels Organization All-Star by MiLB.com

Major leagues

2018–2020: Inconsistent playing time
Ward was called up to the majors for the first time on August 14, 2018, and made his MLB debut that day against the San Diego Padres at Petco Park. In his first plate appearance, Ward hit an RBI double off Brett Kennedy. He finished his debut at 2-for-3 with an RBI and a walk. Ward hit his first major league home run on August 18, a solo shot off Eddie Butler. He finished his abrupt first season hitting .178 with six home runs and 15 RBIs in 40 games.

In 2019, Ward was intermittently sent between Triple-A and the major leagues, including five options to Salt Lake before August. He received minimal playing time at third base as the Angels opted to give Zack Cozart, David Fletcher, and Matt Thaiss a majority of time at the position. During a minor league stint in May, Ward was converted to play left fielder. In September, the Angels gave him his longest stint of the year with the major league club to replace an injured Justin Upton in left field. Ward batted .306 with 27 home runs and 71 RBIs in 106 games with Salt Lake and .292 with a home run and two RBIs in 20 games with the Angels.

Ward began the COVID-19-shortened 2020 season with the major league club, switching between left field and right field to flank Mike Trout. On August 18, the Angels optioned Ward to the alternate training site being used in lieu of the cancelled minor league season. He was recalled to the major leagues on September 3 to finish out the season with the Angels. In 34 games, Ward hit .277 with five RBIs.

2021–present: Emergence in the outfield
In 2021, Ward joined the major league club in May as a right fielder. He was batting .215 with four home runs through his first month, but his batting average improved as the season progressed. On June 17, Ward hit his first career grand slam, coming off Kyle Funkhouser in the 7th inning of a 7–5 win over the Detroit Tigers. On July 22, Ward was optioned to Salt Lake. He was placed on the 7-day injured list on July 30 and began a rehab assignment with the Arizona Complex League Angels on September 16. Ward was recalled to the major leagues on September 29 but returned to the injured list on October 3 for a right adductor strain. Ward finished 2021 hitting .250 with eight home runs and 33 RBIs in 65 games.

Ward began the 2022 season on the 10-day injured list with a groin strain he endured during a spring training game. He made his season debut on April 16, going 2-for-3 with a solo home run against the Texas Rangers. On April 25, Ward hit two home runs and provided all the offense in his first multi-homer game, a 3–0 victory over the Cleveland Guardians. On April 27, later in the same series against Cleveland, Ward went 3-for-4 with a double, a walk, his second career grand slam, and a triple, falling a single shy from hitting for the cycle in the 9–5 victory. Ward was named the American League Player of the Week for April 25 – May 1, a span where he batted .448 with a .484 on-base percentage, a 1.000 slugging percentage, 10 runs scored, and 11 RBIs. On May 20, Ward exited a game against the Oakland Athletics after colliding with the right field wall and was considered day-to-day. Ward suffered a hamstring injury in a game against the Philadelphia Phillies on June 3 and was placed on the injured list on June 5. He returned to the Angels' lineup on June 14. Midway through the season, it was discovered that Ward's bat speed had dropped by about  since his wall collision in May. Between the collision and the end of July, Ward batted .217 with a .610 on-base plus slugging percentage (OPS), a decrease from his pre-injury numbers. On August 13, Ward hit a walk-off two-run home run in the 11th inning of a game against the Minnesota Twins, his second career walk-off homer, to win 5–3. In late August, Ward did not make the Angels' trip for a series against the Toronto Blue Jays because of a Canadian travel ban against foreign nationals who had not received a COVID-19 vaccine. Ward finished the 2022 season batting .281 with 23 home runs and 65 RBIs in 135 games. His .281 batting average and .360 OBP was the highest among qualified Angels batters and his 3.7 Wins Above Replacement (WAR) was third-most on the team.

On January 13, 2023, Ward signed a one-year, $2.75 million contract with the Angels, avoiding salary arbitration. Prior to the start of the 2023 season, it was announced that Ward would be moved from right field to left field to account for the team's trade acquisition of Hunter Renfroe.

References

External links

1993 births
Living people
Arizona Complex League Angels players
Baseball catchers
Baseball players from Dayton, Ohio
Burlington Bees players
Fresno State Bulldogs baseball players
Orleans Firebirds players
Inland Empire 66ers of San Bernardino players
Leones del Escogido players
American expatriate baseball players in the Dominican Republic
Los Angeles Angels players
Major League Baseball third basemen
Mobile BayBears players
Orem Owlz players
Salt Lake Bees players
Scottsdale Scorpions players
Anchorage Bucs players